Delaware became a U.S. state in 1787, which allowed it to send  congressional delegations to the United States Senate and United States House of Representatives beginning with the 1st United States Congress in 1789. Voters in each state elect two senators to serve for six years, and members of the House to two-year terms. Before 1914 United States Senators were chosen by the Delaware General Assembly and before 1935 all congressional terms began March 4.

This is a chronological listing, in timeline format, of the congressional delegations from Delaware to the United States Senate and United States House of Representatives.

The dates for the various Congress represent the range of dates they could have been in session, rather than the actual dates of the sessions.  Congressional terms began on March 4 through 1933. Since 1935 they have begun on January 3. The juxtaposition of the terms with the sessions is approximate; see the footnotes for actual dates of special appointments, elections, resignations or deaths.

Current delegation 

Delaware's current congressional delegation in the  consists of its two senators and its sole representative, all of whom are Democrats.

The current dean of the Delaware's delegation is Senator Tom Carper, having served in the Senate since 2001, and previously served in the House from 1983 until 1993.

United States Senate 

The alternating grey and white boxes indicate the duration of the six-year Senate terms.

United States House of Representatives 

In Delaware all representatives have been elected statewide at-large, rather than by district. Delaware has always had one seat apportioned to it, except for the 13th through 17th Congresses (1813–1823), when it was apportioned two seats per 1810 census.

Key

See also

List of United States congressional districts
Delaware's congressional districts
Political party strength in Delaware

References

External links
 Biographical Directory of the U.S. Congress
 Delaware’s Members of Congress
 Election Statistics
 Political Graveyard

Politics of Delaware
Delaware
Congressional delegations